Bent Creek may refer to:

Bent Creek, Virginia, an unincorporated community in Appomattox County
Bent Creek Campus of the Appalachian Forest Experiment Station, near Asheville, North Carolina
Bent Creek, Buncombe County, North Carolina
Bent Creek, Yancey County, North Carolina